Iraqi chemical attacks against Iran refers to chemical attacks used by the Iraqi armed forces against Iranian combatants and non-combatants during the Iran–Iraq War. The Iraqi armed forces employed chemical weapons against combatants and non-combatants in border cities and villages and more than 30 attacks against Iranian civilians were reported. There were chemical attacks against some medical centers and hospitals by the Iraqi army. According to a 2002 article in the Star-Ledger, 20,000 Iranian combatants and combat medics were killed on the spot by nerve gas. As of 2002, 5,000 of the 80,000 survivors continue to seek regular medical treatment, while 1,000 are hospital inpatients. According to the Geneva Protocol, chemical attacks were banned, but in practice, to prevent an Iranian victory, the United States supported the Iraqi army in their use of chemical weapons.

Background
After the 1973 Arab–Israeli War, Iraq decided to improve all aspects of its army. Iraqi General Ra'ad al-Hamdani stated that, in spite of careful analysis of the 1973 Arab–Israeli War, no clear progress in the Iraqi Army was achieved by the Ba'ath Party. In comparison to their Israeli counterparts, the Iraqi Army was faced with a significant deficit in technological expertise. In 1979, due to Saddam Hussein's policies as well as those of leading Ba'ath Party officials and senior military officers, the Iraqi Army underwent increasing politicization. There was a saying at the time, "better a good Ba'athist than a good soldier". During the early months of the Iran–Iraq War, Iraq attained successes because of Ba'ath Party interference and its attempts to improve the Iraqi Army, but the essential problem was that the military leaders did not have a clear strategy or operational aim for a war.

Reporter Michael Dobbs of the Washington Post stated that Reagan's administration was well aware that the materials sold to Iraq would be used to manufacture chemical weapons for use in the war against Iran. He stated that Iraq's use of chemical weapons was "hardly a secret, with the Iraqi military issuing this warning in February 1984: 'The invaders should know that for every harmful insect, there is an insecticide capable of annihilating it ... and Iraq possesses this annihilation insecticide.'" According to Reagan's foreign policy, every attempt to save Iraq was necessary and legal.

According to Iraqi documents, assistance in the development of chemical weapons was obtained from firms in many countries, including the United States, West Germany, the Netherlands, the United Kingdom, and France. A report stated that Dutch, Australian, Italian, French and both West and East German companies were involved in the export of raw materials to Iraqi chemical weapons factories.

History
Chemical weapons were employed by Iraqi forces against Iranian combatants and non-combatants during the Iran–Iraq war (1980–1988). These have been classified based on chemical composition and casualty-producing effects. The best-known substances used by the Iraqi army were organophosphate neurotoxins, known as nerve agents Tabun, Sarin, and mustard gas. According to Iraqi reports, in 1981 vomiting agents were used in initial and small-scale attacks. In August 1983, chemical weapons had been employed on the Piranshahr and Haj-Omaran battlefields. Next, they were used on the Panjwin battlefield, in November 1983. The Iraqi army began extensive chemical attacks in 1984, by using tons of sulfur mustard and nerve agents on the Majnoon Islands.

In 1986, the Iranian forces mounted an attack on the Faw Peninsula southeast of Basra and occupied the peninsula. This attack had not been anticipated by the Iraqi military, which did not prepare for an assault on the Faw Peninsula from across the Shatt Al-Arab. The integration and cooperation between the Iranian Army and various militias allowed them to organize operations during winter 1985–1986 carefully. As a result, Iraq's oil wells were in danger. Iraqi General Hamdani called the fighting for the liberation of the peninsula another "Battle of the Somme", where both militaries suffered huge losses. The chemical attacks played an important role in Iraq's success. The chemical attacks took place until the last day of war, in August 1988. During the eight-year Iran–Iraq War, more than 350 large-scale gas attacks were reported in the border areas.

Attacks on civilians 

The Iraqi Army employed chemical weapons in attacks against combatants and non-combatants in border cities and villages and more than 30 attacks against Iranian civilians have been reported, as follows:

On 28 June 1987 in Sardasht, West Azerbaijan
In March 1988 in villages around the city of Marivan
On 16 March 1988 in the Halabja, with the massacre of more than 5,000 civilians
In May–June 1988 in villages around the cities of Sarpol-e Zahab, Gilan-e-gharb and Oshnavieh
There have been chemical attacks by the Iraqi army against medical centers and hospitals.

Casualties 
In a declassified 1991 report, the CIA estimated that Iran had suffered more than 50,000 casualties from Iraq's use of several chemical weapons, though current estimates are more than 100,000, as the long-term effects continue to cause damage. The official CIA estimate did not include the civilian population contaminated in bordering towns or the children and relatives of veterans, many of whom have developed blood, lung and skin complications, according to the Organization for Veterans of Iran. According to a 2002 article in the Star-Ledger, 20,000 Iranian soldiers were killed on the spot by nerve gas. As of 2002, 5,000 of the 80,000 survivors continue to seek regular medical treatment, with 1,000 being hospital inpatients.

International convention 

Because of reports implying the use of chemical weapons by the Iraqi army, a presidential directive was issued by the U.S.
Iran asked the UN to engage in preventing Iraq from using chemical weapon agents, but there were no strong actions by the UN or other international organizations. UN specialist teams were dispatched to Iran at the request of the Iranian Government, in March 1984, April 1985, February–March 1986, April 1987, and in March, July and August 1988. As a result, according to the field inspections, clinical examinations of casualties and laboratory analyses of samples done by the UN fact-finding team's investigations, the use by the Iraqi army of mustard gas and nerve agents against Iranians was confirmed. The Security Council ratified these reports and two statements were issued, on 13 March 1984 and 21 March 1986, condemning Iraq for those chemical attacks, but the Iraqi regime did not abide by those condemnations and continued launching chemical attacks.

See also
 Disabled Iranian veterans
 Ahmad Zangiabadi
 Iraqi chemical weapons program

References

Iran
Disability in Iran
Iraqi war crimes
Chemical weapons in the Iran–Iraq War
Military operations involving chemical weapons during the Iran–Iraq War
Chemical weapons
Chemical weapons attacks

External links
 Chemical Weapons and the Iran-Iraq war: A case study in non-compliance; Javed Ali, James Martin Center for Nonproliferation Studies (Middlebury Institute of International Studies at Monterey).